Annalisa Nisiro (born 11 May 1973) is an Italian former swimmer. She competed in the women's 200 metre breaststroke at the 1988 Summer Olympics.

References

External links
 

1973 births
Living people
Olympic swimmers of Italy
Swimmers at the 1988 Summer Olympics
People from Faenza
Italian female breaststroke swimmers
Sportspeople from the Province of Ravenna
20th-century Italian women